Altüst ("Upsidedown" in Turkish) is a quarterly political magazine published in Turkey. The magazine was first published on 1 April 2011. It has a socialist stance.

Editorial board members and contributors
Şenol Karakaş
İbrahim Sediyani
Doğan Akhanlı
Roni Margulies

References

External links
Official Website of the magazine

2011 establishments in Turkey
Magazines established in 2011
Quarterly magazines
Socialist magazines
Turkish-language magazines
Political magazines published in Turkey